Gargrave is a large village and civil parish in the Craven district located along the A65,  north-west of Skipton in North Yorkshire, England.
It is situated on the very edge of the Yorkshire Dales. The River Aire and the Leeds and Liverpool Canal pass through the village. It had a population of 1,764 in 2001 reducing slightly to 1,755 at the 2011 census.

Etymology
Multiple etymologies have been proposed for the name Gargrave. The name may contain Old English gāra in its original meaning of "spear" formed with graf apparently meaning wood, originally meaning "wood from which spear-shafts were cut". The first part of the name may also have had the sense "triangular piece of land" and was replaced by the cognate Old Norse gieri. Also suggested is that the name contains one of the Old Norse names with Geir- (e.g. Geirmundr, Geirlaug) with the Old English termination græf, "grave, trench", Gargrave therefore meaning "grave of the Scandinavian Giermundr, Geirlaug etc". William Wheater thought Gargrave to be derived the Celtic caer and the Saxon gerefa, meaning "the camp or city of the reeve/governor". The element -grave may be a "Celtic lenited" variant of Craven.

History 

At Kirk Sink in the second century the Romans built a villa in flat meadowland near the River Aire. It was excavated in 1968–1974 by Brian Hartley. Its central room had a seven-metre square mosaic floor and a bath house was built alongside. The villa was surrounded by two ditches.

In the 1820s the main industry in Gargrave was cotton manufacturing and along the side of the canal were numerous warehouses. The population at this time was 972 and there were several public houses including the pubs named the Masons Arms and the Swan Inn.

Gargrave House was built in 1917 by the distinguished Scottish architect, James Dunn. It is a Grade II listed building.

The Old Swan is also Grade II listed and was named the Keighley and Craven CAMRA Pub of the Season for summer 1998.

Governance 

Gargrave is in the Gargrave and Malhamdale ward of the non-unitary authority, Craven District Council, and is also served by the North Yorkshire County Council for local services. The population of this ward at the 2011 Census was measured at 3,037. For parliamentary elections Gargrave is in the Skipton and Ripon constituency.

Transport 

The Leeds and Liverpool Canal passes through the village and the main road is the A65 Leeds to Kendal road. There has been a long-running campaign to have a by-pass built around the village. Gargrave railway station is served by rail services to Skipton and Leeds to the east and Morecambe and Carlisle to the west. Gargrave has bus links to Skipton, Settle, Malham, Barnoldswick and Preston.

Religion 

The parish church is dedicated to St Andrew was built in 1521 and restored in 1852, though there is thought to have been a church on the site long before this time. Robert of Newminster who was born in the parish in about 1100 was an early rector.

Former Chancellor of the Exchequer Iain Macleod is buried in the south-east corner of the churchyard.

Leisure 

Being on the edge of the Yorkshire Dales National Park and having the Pennine Way National Trail going through the village, Gargrave is a popular destination for hikers and cyclists. Gargrave has a village hall hosting art exhibitions, tea dances, snooker, lectures, indoor bowls and pantomimes.

Sport 
Gargrave AFC, the village football club, had an A and a B team playing in the Premier Division and Division 1 of the Craven League until 2016 when they withdrew from the league.

The cricket club has first and second team playing in the Craven and District Cricket League.

There is also a snooker club and a bowling club in the village as well as the Craven Lawn Tennis Club being sited there.

Since the turn of the century there is a golf society run from the Masons Arms public house in the village.

Notable people
St Robert of Newminster (c.1100–1159), priest and abbot, was born in Gargrave.
Adam Osgodby (died 1316), English lawyer and parson of Gargrave.
Robert Shute (died April 1590), English judge and politician, was born in Gargrave. 
Robert Story (1795–1860), known as "the Craven Poet", lived in Gargrave.
The Rt Hon Iain Macleod (1913–1970), British politician and government minister, is buried in Gargrave churchyard.
The Rt Rev'd Ian Harland (1932–2008), former Bishop of Lancaster and Carlisle, retired to Gargrave in 2000.
Julian Sands, actor, lived in Gargrave from 1963 until the mid-1970's

References

External links

 The Leeds Liverpool Canal in Gargrave
 Genuki Homepage
 Gargrave Homepage
 Craven and District Cricket League
 Masons Arms Golf Society
 Gargrave Parish Council

Villages in North Yorkshire
Civil parishes in North Yorkshire
Craven District